Gérard-Joseph Deschamps (4 July 1929 – 25 February 2022) was a Canadian Roman Catholic prelate.

Deschamps was born in Eastview, Frontenac County, Ontario on 4 July 1929 and was ordained to the priesthood in 1954. He was Bishop of Daru in Papua New Guinea from 1966 until 1999, when he became bishop of the Roman Catholic Diocese of Bereina. He resigned in 2002, and died on 25 February 2022, at the age of 92.

References 

1929 births
2022 deaths
20th-century Roman Catholic bishops in Papua New Guinea
21st-century Roman Catholic bishops in Papua New Guinea
Canadian Roman Catholic bishops
Franco-Ontarian people
People from Frontenac County
Roman Catholic bishops of Bereina
Roman Catholic bishops of Daru-Kiunga